Don Pedro Carlos (Pedro Carlos Antonio Rafael José Javier Francisco Juan Nepomuceno Tomás de Villanueva Marcos Marcelino Vicente Ferrer Raimundo; 18 June 1786 – 4 July 1812) was an Infante of Spain and Portugal.

Family

Infante Pedro Carlos was a son of Infante Gabriel of Spain and Infanta Mariana Victoria of Portugal. His paternal grandfather was King Charles III of Spain and his maternal grandfather was King Peter III of Portugal. Pedro Carlos was the only surviving child of the couple and an orphan at the age of two.

Life
His father, a very intelligent man, was King Charles III's favorite son, but he and his wife died in 1788 of smallpox. King Charles III also died the same year; his successor Charles IV of Spain sent the child away to Portugal, as requested by his grandmother, Queen Maria I of Portugal. Maria was worried about the Braganza succession and Pedro Carlos was then her only grandchild. He was raised by Maria, who created him an infante of Portugal.

Pedro Carlos had inherited a large fortune from his father and was welcomed in Portugal. In 1792 his grandmother was officially declared insane and her son John, uncle of Pedro Carlos, became Regent of Portugal.

In 1807, France invaded Portugal, and the royal family fled to Brazil, including Pedro Carlos. They left on 29 November on board the Príncipe Real.

They arrived in Salvador de Bahia on 2 January 1808 and headed from there to Rio de Janeiro, where the infante lived in the São Cristovão Palace.

Marriage
In Brazil Pedro Carlos was engaged to his cousin Maria Teresa, Princess of Beira, daughter of Carlota Joaquina of Spain and John VI of Portugal, and they married on 13 May 1810 in Rio de Janeiro.

The couple was very happy during their two years of marriage, after which Pedro Carlos became ill and died in Quinta da Boa Vista on 4 July 1812.

The couple had one child:
Infante Sebastian of Portugal and Spain, born in Río de Janeiro on 4 November 1811.

Ancestry

References

Knights of the Golden Fleece of Spain
Deaths from smallpox
1786 births
1812 deaths
House of Bourbon-Braganza
Portuguese infantes
Spanish infantes